St. Bartholomew's Church, commonly called St. Bart's, is a historic Episcopal parish founded in January 1835, and located on the east side of Park Avenue between 50th and 51st Street in Midtown Manhattan, in New York City. In 2018, the church celebrated the centennial of its first service in its Park Avenue home.

In 2020, it reported 2,196 members, average attendance of 386, and $2,791,353 in plate and pledge income.

On October 31, 2016, the St. Bartholomew's Church and Community House complex was designated a National Historic Landmark, for its significance as an important example of early 20th-century ecclesiastical architecture designed by Bertram Goodhue.

Former structures

The congregation's first location was opened for service in January 1835, in a plain church at the corner of Great Jones Street and fashionable Lafayette Place.

The second location, built from 1872 to 1876 at the southwest corner of Madison Avenue and East 44th Street, was designed by James Renwick, the architect of St. Patrick's Cathedral, in the Lombardic style. The building was embellished in 1902–1903 with a triple French Romanesque Revival portal by Stanford White, who took as his inspiration the church of Saint-Gilles, Gard, between Arles and Nîmes, which White had admired in 1878; the sculptures in the tympana are Renaissance-inspired. The portal was paid for by the family of Cornelius Vanderbilt II as a memorial; Vanderbilt's father, William H. Vanderbilt, had sold the site to the church. The magnificent bronze doors, with bas-reliefs in panels depicting episodes from the Old and New Testaments, were carried out by some of New York's established sculptors: Andrew O'Connor, working freely under the general direction of Daniel Chester French, executed the main door; the south door was executed by Herbert Adams, the north door by Philip Martiny.

Present structure
The current church was erected in 1916–17. The original freely handled and simplified Byzantine Revival design by Bertram Goodhue was called "a jewel in a monumental setting" by Christine Smith in 1988. Goodhue modified his design in response to the requirement that the old church portal, beloved by the parishioners, be preserved, with its bronze doors, from the Madison Avenue building and re-erected on the new site.

The foundation stone of Goodhue's original design, a vast, unified barrel-vaulted space, without side aisles or chapels and with severely reduced transepts, was laid May 1, 1917 and the construction was sufficiently far along for the church to be consecrated in 1918; its design was altered during construction, after Goodhue's sudden, unexpected death in 1924, by his office associates, in partnership as Mayers, Murray and Philips; they were engaged in erecting the community house, continuing with the same materials, subtly variegated salmon and cream-colored bricks and creamy Indiana limestone; they designed the terrace that still provides the equivalent of a small square, surrounded by the cliff-like facades of Midtown commercial structures; in summer, supplied with umbrellas and tables, it becomes the outside dining area for the restaurant, Inside Park. They also inserted the "much discussed" dome, tile-patterned on the exterior and with a polychrome Hispano-Moresque interior dome, which substituted for the spire that had been planned but never built. Completed in 1930, the church contains stained-glass windows and mosaics by Hildreth Meiere, and a marble baptismal font by the Danish follower of Canova, Bertel Thorvaldsen. St. Bartholomew's was completed at a cost of $5.4 million.

The church is known for a wide range of programs. It draws parishioners from all areas of New York City and surroundings. It is the final resting place for actresses Lillian Gish (1893–1993), Dorothy Gish (1898–1968), and their mother Mary Gish (1876–1948).

Landmark status
Saint Bartholomew's Church and Community House was designated a landmark by the New York City Landmarks Preservation Commission in 1967, a move opposed at the time by the rector and vestry. Beginning in 1981, St. Bartholomew's found itself the subject of a much-publicized case concerning air rights in the highly-competitive New York real estate market clashing with historical preservation. Some of the members of the parish wanted to replace the community house and open terrace with a high-rise commercial structure that would re-capitalize the parish's depleted funds; following a series of public hearing the Landmarks Preservation Commission turned down the plans for a high-rise office building. The church unsuccessfully argued before the United States Court of Appeals for the Second Circuit in Manhattan that the Landmark designation violated their constitutional rights. That decision was appealed to the U.S. Supreme Court, which eventually resolved the matter in favor of the Landmarks Commission in 1991 by declining to hear the appeal. 

In 1992, with the parish's support, the St Bartholomew's Preservation Foundation was established. After a two-year fund drive, restoration of the St. Bartholomew's site began. Leaking roof drains were made watertight, the iconic dome was temporarily secured, and the Great Terrace and 50th Street wall were rebuilt. "Inside Park," the site's popular restaurant, also opened in 1992. In 2012, the wholly independent St. Bartholomew's Conservancy replaced the St. Bartholomew's Preservation Foundation.

The National Historic Landmarks Committee of the National Park Service Advisory Board unanimously recommended that the St. Bartholomew's site be designated a National Historic Landmark, citing its importance as an exceptional work of architecture and art. On November 2, 2016, St. Bartholomew's Church and Community House were designated a National Historic Landmark. Restoration of the church's iconic dome was completed in 2017.

Music
One of the church's former choir-directors was the famous conductor Leopold Stokowski, who was brought from the United Kingdom by St. Bart's; he was followed by the organist-choirmaster David McKinley Williams.  St. Bartholomew's is noted for its Skinner Organ Company pipe organ, the largest in New York and one of the ten largest in the world. It was dedicated in a concert December 9, 1930, in a concert given by Williams. Another of the church's music directors was Harold Friedell, the well-known composer and Juilliard educator. The church's renowned choir has maintained its distinction under the direction of conductors such as organist-music director Jack Ossewaarde, William Trafka and James Litton. The Chorister Program has also had success in bringing together children ages 6–18 to sing in the church, and has been featured on shows such as The Today Show and Good Morning America.

In popular culture 
 In the 1981 movie Arthur, Arthur's (Dudley Moore) wedding with Susan Johnson (Jill Eikenberry) was to take place at St. Bart's. The infamous wedding scene in the remake of the same film was also filmed at St. Bart's in July 2010.
 In the 1995 movie It Takes Two, the wedding of Roger Calloway (Steve Guttenberg) in the climax is at St. Bartholomew’s.
 In the 2010 film Salt, the Russian President is supposedly killed in the church while delivering a eulogy at the funeral of the late American Vice President.
 In the television series Mad Men, Margaret Sterling, the daughter of Roger Sterling, plans to marry in the church.
 In the television series Everything’s Gonna Be Okay , Matilda, Genevieve, and Nicholas visit the church during their visit to New York.

Gallery

See also

 Anglican Communion
 Anglo-Catholicism
 Churches Uniting in Christ
 List of National Historic Landmarks in New York City
 Complete List of Presiding Bishops
 National Register of Historic Places listings in Manhattan from 14th to 59th Streets
 Succession of Bishops of the Episcopal Church in the United States

References
Notes

Citations

Further reading

External links 

 
 Architectural images of St. Bart's

1835 establishments in New York (state)
20th-century Episcopal church buildings
Bertram Goodhue church buildings
Byzantine Revival architecture in New York City
Church buildings with domes
Churches completed in 1903
Saint Bartholomew's Episcopal Church
Saint Bartholomew's Episcopal Church, New York City
Midtown Manhattan
National Historic Landmarks in Manhattan
New York City Designated Landmarks in Manhattan
Properties of religious function on the National Register of Historic Places in Manhattan
Religious organizations established in 1835
Romanesque Revival church buildings in New York City

de:St. Bartholomew’s Church